Rhubarb pie is a pie with a rhubarb filling. It is popular in the UK, where rhubarb has been cultivated since the 1600s, and the leaf stalks eaten since the 1700s. Besides diced rhubarb, it almost always contains a large amount of sugar to balance the intense tartness of the plant. The pie is usually prepared with a bottom pie crust and a variety of styles of upper crust. In the United States, often a lattice-style upper crust is used. This pie is a traditional dessert in the United States.  It is part of New England cuisine. Rhubarb has long been a popular choice for pies in the Great Plains region and the Midwest Region, where fruits were not always readily available. Rhubarb pies and desserts are popular in Canada as well, as the rhubarb plant can survive in cold climates.

A strawberry rhubarb pie is a type of tart and sweet pie made with a strawberry and rhubarb filling.  Sometimes tapioca is also used.

See also

 List of strawberry dishes
 List of pies, tarts and flans

References

American pies
British desserts
British pies
English cuisine
German pies
German desserts
Fruit pies
Strawberry dishes
Cuisine of the Midwestern United States
Cuisine of the Southern United States
New England cuisine
Cuisine of West Virginia
Rhubarb